Strandberg is a surname of Swedish origin which may refer to:

 Alfreda Strandberg (1883–1953), American song writer
 Britt Strandberg (born 1934), Swedish cross country skier who competed in three Winter Olympics 
 Carlos Strandberg (born 1996), Swedish footballer
 Conny and Johanna Strandberg, Swedish male-female sidecarcross team
 Jan-Olof Strandberg (born 1926), Swedish stage and film actor
 John Edmund Strandberg (1911-1996), Swedish-Canadian Landscape painter
 Lennart Strandberg (1915-1989), Swedish sprinter
 Mikael Strandberg (born 1962), Swedish explorer, filmmaker and writer
 Stefan Strandberg (born 1990), Norwegian footballer
 Torkild Strandberg (born 1970), Swedish Liberal People's Party politician, former member of the Riksdag

Swedish-language surnames